, also known by its nickname "Biden", is a trans-Neptunian object of the sednoid population, located in the outermost reaches of the Solar System. It was first observed on 5 November 2012 by American astronomers Scott Sheppard and Chad Trujillo at the Cerro Tololo Inter-American Observatory in Chile. The discovery was announced on 26 March 2014. The object probably measures somewhere between 300 and 1000 km in diameter, possibly large enough to be a dwarf planet.

Classification and physical characteristics 
 is the minor planet with the farthest known perihelion (closest approach to the Sun) in the Solar System, greater than 's. Though its perihelion is farther,  has an aphelion only about half of Sedna's.

It has an absolute magnitude of 4.0, which means it may be large enough to be a dwarf planet. It is expected to be about half the size of Sedna and similar in size to Huya. Its surface is thought to have a pink tinge, resulting from chemical changes produced by the effect of radiation on frozen water, methane, and carbon dioxide. This optical color is consistent with formation in the gas-giant region and not the classical Kuiper belt, which is dominated by ultra-red colored objects.

History

Discovery 

 was first observed on 5 November 2012 with NOAO's 4-meter Víctor M. Blanco Telescope at the Cerro Tololo Inter-American Observatory. Carnegie's 6.5-meter Magellan telescope at Las Campanas Observatory in Chile was used to determine its orbit and surface properties. Before being announced to the public, it was only tracked by Cerro Tololo Inter-American Observatory (807) and Las Campanas Observatory (304). Two precovery measurements from 22 October 2011 have been reported. A primary issue with observing it and finding precovery observations of it is that at an apparent magnitude of 23, it is too faint for most telescopes to easily observe.

Nickname 

 was abbreviated "VP" and nicknamed "Biden" by the discovery team, after Joe Biden who, at the time of discovery, was vice president ("VP") of the United States.

Orbit 

 has the largest perihelion distance of any known object in the Solar System. Its last perihelion was within a couple months of September 1979. The paucity of bodies with perihelia at  appears not to be an observational artifact.

It is possibly a member of a hypothesized Hills cloud. It has a perihelion, argument of perihelion, and current position in the sky similar to those of Sedna. This could indicate a similar formation mechanism for these bodies.  was the first such object discovered.

It is currently unknown how  acquired a perihelion distance beyond the Kuiper belt. The characteristics of its orbit, like those of Sedna's, have been explained as possibly created by a passing star or a trans-Neptunian planet of several Earth masses hundreds of astronomical units from the Sun. The orbital architecture of the trans-Plutonian region may signal the presence of more than one planet.  could even be captured from another planetary system.

See also
List of Solar System objects most distant from the Sun
90377 Sedna (relatively large and also distant body)
541132 Leleākūhonua (distant sednoid)
List of hyperbolic comets
Other large aphelion objects





Notes

References

External links 

 2012 VP113 Inner Oort Cloud Object Discovery Images from Scott S. Sheppard/Carnegie Institution for Science.
 2012 VP113 has Q=460 ± 30  (mpml: CFHT 2011-Oct-22 precovery)
 List of Known Trans-Neptunian Objects, Johnston's Archive
 List Of Centaurs and Scattered-Disk Objects, Minor Planet Center
 

Sednoids

Minor planet object articles (unnumbered)

2014 in space
20121105
Joe Biden